This is a list of hospitals in Beijing.

References

Hospitals
Beijing
Beijing